Trimeresurus is a genus of venomous pit vipers found in Asia from the Indian Subcontinent throughout Southeast Asia, China, and the Pacific Islands. Currently 44 species are recognized. Common names include Asian palm pit vipers, Asian lanceheads, and green pit vipers.

Description
Most species in the genus Trimeresurus are relatively small, primarily arboreal species, with thin bodies and prehensile tails. Most Trimeresurus species are typically green in color, but some species also have yellow, black, orange, red, or gold markings.

Feeding
The diet of Trimeresurus species includes a variety of animals, including lizards, amphibians, birds, rodents, and other small mammals.

Reproduction
Like most viper species, many of the species in the genus Trimeresurus are ovoviviparous, bearing live young. However, some species such as T. flavoviridis, T. kaulbacki, and T. macrolepis are oviparous, laying eggs.  Also, the reproductive biology of some Trimeresurus species is as yet unknown.

Venom
Trimeresurus venom varies in toxicity between species, but all are primarily hemotoxic and considered to be medically significant to humans.

Geographic range
Species in the genus Trimeresurus are found in Southeast Asia from India (including regions of the North Chotanagpur division of Jharkhand) to Southern China and Japan, and the Malay Archipelago to Timor.

Species

*) Not including the nominate subspecies.
T) Type species.

Taxonomy
Additional species that may be recognized by other sources include:

 T. barati Regenass & Kramer, 1981. Commonly called Barat's bamboo viper, found in Indonesia.
 T. fucatus Vogel, David & Pauwels, 2004. Commonly called the Siamese peninsula pit viper and found in southern Thailand, Myanmar, Malaysia.

The genus Trimeresurus (sensu lato) has been the subject of considerable taxonomic work since 2000, resulting in the recognition of additional genera within this complex. Most authors now recognise the genus Protobothrops for the species cornutus, flavoviridis, jerdonii, kaulbacki, mucrosquamatus, tokarensis, xiangchengensis, since these have been shown not to be closely related to other Trimeresurus in recent phylogenetic analyses.

In addition, Malhotra and Thorpe (2004) proposed a radical shake up of the entire genus, splitting Trimeresurus into seven genera. Their proposed arrangement (including species described since 2004) is shown in the table below:

This new arrangement has been followed by many, but not all subsequent authors.

David et al. (2011) considered some of the genera of Malhotra & Thorpe to be subgenera of the genus Trimeresurus, creating new combinations such as "Trimeresurus (Parias) flavomaculatus", "Trimeresurus (Popeia) popeiorum", "Trimeresurus (Viridovipera) stejnegeri", etc.

Gallery

See also
 Craspedocephalus
 Ovophis
 Protobothrops

References

Further reading
Lacépède BG (1804). "Mémoire sur plusieurs animaux de la Nouvelle-Hollande dont la description n'a pas encore été publiée " [Memoir on several animals of New Holland whose description has not yet been published]. Annales du Muséum d'Histoire Naturelle, Paris 4: 184-211. (Trimeresurus, new genus, p. 209). (in French).

 
Snake genera
Taxa named by Bernard Germain de Lacépède